Żelazo  (German: Selesen) is a village in the administrative district of Gmina Smołdzino, within Słupsk County, Pomeranian Voivodeship, in northern Poland.

The village has a population of 312.

References

Villages in Słupsk County